Eildon is a committee area of the Scottish Borders Council, and a hamlet within that area.

Eildon may also refer to these places:
Eildon, Victoria, a township in Australia
Lake Eildon, formed by Eildon Dam near the town
Electoral district of Eildon, electoral district of the Victorian Legislative Assembly

Eildon Hill, in the Scottish Borders